Misschief Films is a snowboarding film and production company founded in 2005 that produces all-girl movies.

History

Co-founded by female snowboarders Amber Stackhouse and Fabia Grueebler with the goal of progressing female snowboarding and providing more exposure to female snowboarders.  Stackhouse came up with the idea for an all-girl company after existing snowboarding filmmakers would not commit to an all-girl project.

Their two films are "Ro Sham Bo" and "As If," both featuring an all female cast, something that is rare in snowboarding videos.

Riders
Features female professional snowboarders:
Natasza Zurek, Laura Hadar, Victoria Jealouse, Erin Comstock, Hana Beaman, Annie Boulanger, Anne-Flore Marxer, Izumi Amaike, Stacy Thomas, Marie-France Roy, Leanne Pelosi, Tara Dakides, Silvia Mittermuller, Spencer O'Brien, Jacqui Berg, Amber Stackhouse, Priscilla Levac, Maribeth Swetkoff, Alexis Waite, Kelly Clark, Gretchen Bleiler, Torah Bright, and Jamie Anderson.

Current projects

Misschief is not planning on releasing any films for the 2007-2008 season.  Look for future projects from offshoot film company Runway Films.

External links
 Trailer for "As If" and "Ro Sham Bo"
 Ro Sham Bo Review

References

Snowboarding companies